Theodore II Eirenikos, (? – 31 January 1216), also known as Theodore Kopas or Koupas (Κωπάς/Κουπάς), was a high-ranking Byzantine official and chief minister during most of the reign of the Byzantine emperor  Alexios III Angelos (r. 1195–1203). After the fall of Constantinople to the Fourth Crusade, he fled to the Empire of Nicaea, where he became a monk and served as Patriarch of Constantinople in exile in 1214–1216.

Political career
An intelligent, well-spoken and educated man, he rose to power following the disgrace and exile of Alexios' hitherto favourite official, Constantine Mesopotamites, in autumn 1197. Eirenikos succeeded Mesopotamites in his confidential and influential palace post of epi tou kanikleiou (secretary of the imperial inkpot), and as chief minister. He also held the senior court rank of pansebastos sebastos. According to the account of the contemporary historian Niketas Choniates, Eirenikos feared that he would share Mesopotamites' fate, and therefore exercised his power with great restraint. He was anxious not to displease the hereditary aristocracy that dominated the imperial court and that had undermined Mesopotamites' position. To that effect he also neglected to undertake any of the reforms that the Empire desperately needed.

Exile and church career
In April 1204, Constantinople fell to the soldiers of the Fourth Crusade, and like many Byzantine leaders, Theodore fled the city and sought refuge in Asia Minor.  There Theodore was tonsured as a monk. In 1209, the newly proclaimed Nicaean emperor, Theodore I Laskaris, named him to the post of chartophylax of the Patriarchate of Constantinople, re-established in Nicaean exile. Laskaris also awarded him with the title hypatos ton philosophon, a prestigious title given to the head of the faculty of philosophy in Constantinople.

On 28 September 1214, Eirenikos was elected as Patriarch of Constantinople by the patriarchal synod. His tenure was marked by his open confrontation with the Catholic Church, especially over the legitimacy of the Latin Patriarchate of Constantinople and of Catholic control over the Greek Orthodox populations ruled by Latin princes.

Theodore Eirenikos died on 31 January 1216.

References

Sources
 
 
 

12th-century births
1216 deaths
12th-century Byzantine people
13th-century patriarchs of Constantinople
Byzantine officials
People of the Empire of Nicaea